In geometry, the triangular hebesphenorotunda is one of the Johnson solids.

It is one of the elementary Johnson solids, which do not arise from "cut and paste" manipulations of the Platonic and Archimedean solids. However, it does have a strong relationship to the icosidodecahedron, an Archimedean solid. Most evident is the cluster of three pentagons and four triangles on one side of the solid. If these faces are aligned with a congruent patch of faces on the icosidodecahedron, then the hexagonal face will lie in the plane midway between two opposing triangular faces of the icosidodecahedron.

The triangular hebesphenorotunda also has clusters of faces that can be aligned with corresponding faces of the rhombicosidodecahedron: the three lunes, each lune consisting of a square and two antipodal triangles adjacent to the square.

The faces around each  vertex can also be aligned with the corresponding faces of various diminished icosahedra.

Johnson uses the prefix hebespheno- to refer to a blunt wedge-like complex formed by three adjacent lunes, a lune being a square with equilateral triangles attached on opposite sides. The suffix (triangular) -rotunda refers to the complex of three equilateral triangles and three regular pentagons surrounding another equilateral triangle, which bears structural resemblance to the pentagonal rotunda.

The triangular hebesphenorotunda is the only Johnson solid with faces of 3, 4, 5 and 6 sides.

Cartesian coordinates

Cartesian coordinates for the triangular hebesphenorotunda with edge length  – 1 are given by the union of the orbits of the points

under the action of the group generated by rotation by 120° around the z-axis and the reflection about the yz-plane. Here,  =  (sometimes written φ) is the golden ratio. The first point generates the triangle opposite the hexagon, the second point generates the bases of the triangles surrounding the previous triangle, the third point generates the tips of the pentagons opposite the first triangle, and the last point generates the hexagon.

One may then calculate the surface area of a triangular hebesphenorotunda of edge length a as

and its volume as

A second, inverted, triangular hebesphenorotunda can be obtained by negating the second and third coordinates of each point. This second polyhedron will be joined to the first at their common hexagonal face, and the pair will inscribe an icosidodecahedron. If the hexagonal face is scaled by the golden ratio, then the convex hull of the result will be the entire icosidodecahedron.

References

External links
 

Johnson solids